Valter is a spelling variant of the German name Walter, Walther, from Old High German walt "rule" and her "army". The spelling variant in V- is adopted in a number of European languages, including Scandinavian (North Germanic), Finnic (Finnish, Estonian), Slavic (Slovenian, Croatian), Baltic (Latvian, Lithuanian) and Romance (Italian, Portuguese).

Notable people with the name include:

Given name
Valter (Brazilian footballer) (born 1975), Brazilian football striker
Valter Birsa (born 1986), Slovenian football player
Valter Bonča (born 1968), Slovenian racing cyclist
Valter Borges (born 1988), Cape Verdean football player
Valter Chifu (born 1952), Romanian volleyball player
Valter Costa (born 1949), Portuguese football player
Ricardo Valter da Costa (born 1981), Brazilian football player
Valter Dešpalj (born 1947), Croatian cellist
Valter Di Salvo (born 1963), Italian fitness coach
Valter Ever (1902–1981), Estonian track and field athlete
Valter Gabrielsen (1921–1999), Norwegian politician
Valter Giuliani (born 1960), Italian astronomer
Valter Guchua (born 1975), Georgian football player
Valter Heuer (1928–2006), Estonian chess player, chess journalist and chess historian
Lars Valter Hörmander (born 1931), Swedish mathematician
Valter Matošević (born 1970), Croatian team handball player
Valter Neeris (1915–1942), Estonian footballer
Valter Ojakäär (1923–2016), Estonian composer, instrumentalist and author
Valter Palm (1905–1994), Estonian boxer
Valter Perić (1919–1945), Yugoslav partisan
Daniel Valter Rogelim (born 1972), Brazilian racing cyclist
Valter Roman (1913–1983), Romanian communist activist and soldier
Edgar Valter Saks (1910–1984), Estonian statesman, amateur historian and author
Valter Skarsgård (born 1995), Swedish actor
Valter Soosõrv (1903–1969), Estonian actor, theatre director and theatre historian
Valter Tomaz Junior (born 1978), Brazilian football player
Valter Wredberg, Swedish sprint canoer

Surname
Attila Valter (born 1998), Hungarian cyclist
Edgar Valter (1929–2006), Estonian writer and illustrator of children's books

Fictional characters
 Valter, a character from a tactical role-playing game Fire Emblem: The Sacred Stones

See also
Walter (name)
Walters (disambiguation)

References

Scandinavian masculine given names
German masculine given names
Estonian masculine given names

eo:Valtero
fi:Valtteri